Suguna PIP School is located in Coimbatore, India. It is affiliated to the Central Board of Secondary Education (Delhi). 
The school is run by the Suguna Charitable Trust and was established in 2003. The school offers classes from kindergarten to high school. Its campus is 4.5 acres.

References

External links 

 

2003 establishments in Tamil Nadu
Educational institutions established in 2003
Schools in Coimbatore